The Bob Marley Museum is a museum in Kingston, Jamaica, dedicated to the reggae musician Bob Marley. The museum is located at 56 Hope Road, Kingston, and is Bob Marley's former place of residence. It was home to the Tuff Gong reggae record label which was founded by The Wailers in 1970. In 1976, it was the site of a failed assassination attempt on Bob Marley.

There is a song called "56 Hope Road" from the album In the Pursuit of Leisure by Sugar Ray featuring Shaggy.popular for tourists.

See also
 List of music museums

References

External links
Aerial view.
The museum at the Bob Marley Foundation's website.

Buildings and structures in Kingston, Jamaica
Historic house museums in Jamaica
Biographical museums in North America
Music museums
Tourist attractions in Kingston, Jamaica
Bob Marley
Music organisations based in Jamaica